810 Naval Air Squadron was a Royal Navy Fleet Air Arm carrier based squadron formed on 3 April 1933 with the amalgamation of the 12 Blackburn Dart aircraft from 463 and 44 Flight (Fleet Torpedo) Flights Royal Air Force to the Fleet Air Arm. The squadron saw action during the Second World War, the Suez Crisis and the Korean War.

History

Pre war
810 Squadron was assigned to the aircraft carrier  in May 1933 and formed part of the Home Fleet.  In September that year the Darts were replaced by Blackburn Ripons, and these were in turn replaced by Blackburn Baffins in July 1934, with the entire squadron operating Baffins by November that year.  The Abyssinian crisis caused Courageous and the squadron to be transferred to the Mediterranean from August 1935 to February 1936.  The squadron was upgraded to use Blackburn Sharks in April 1937, and then Fairey Swordfish in September 1938.  810 Squadron was then transferred to the new aircraft carrier  the following month, and had embarked by January.  The squadron was amongst those transferred to Admiralty control on 24 May 1939.

Second World War
By the outbreak of war the squadron was aboard Ark Royal, flying 12 Swordfish on anti-submarine patrols. The squadron was involved in activities over Norway after the German invasion in April 1940, and carried out bombing raids on Vaernes aerodrome. They sailed with Ark Royal to Gibraltar, and carried out attacks during the British Attack on Mers-el-Kébir in July.

They then saw action in November at the Battle of Cape Spartivento, and the following year in February carried out bombing attacks on Tirso Dam, Sardinia and bombing attacks on Livorno and La Spezia in Italy.

They left Ark Royal in September, before her sinking in November, and saw service supporting convoy movements to Jamaica. They were then involved in the Battle of Madagascar in May, bombing shipping and land targets at Diego Suarez.

They were re-equipped with Fairey Barracuda IIs in April 1943, after which they returned to the Norwegian coast in July 1943. They then re-embarked aboard HMS Illustrious and operated in support of the Salerno landings. 810 Squadron was then re-grouped as part of the 21st Naval Torpedo Bomber Reconnaissance Wing in October 1943, and sailed in November to join the Eastern Fleet. They carried out attacks on docks and oil tanks at Sabang in Operation Cockpit in April 1944, and followed this in June with raids on the Andaman Islands. Illustrious then put in for a refit at Cape Town. By February 1945 the squadron was back in the UK at RNAS Stretton, where they were re-equipped with the improved Barracuda IIIs. They moved to the airbase at Thorney Island in March, and then to the East Coast, where they trialled the new ASV Mk.XI radar with RAF Coastal Command. The squadron then disbanded in August 1945.

Post war

The squadron was re-formed twice previously at RNAS Lossimouth and went on to see action in the Suez Crisis and earlier during the Korean War flying Hawker Sea Furys. The squadron was then disbanded.

It embarked from RAF North Front at Gibraltar only six weeks later after a record re-conversion to fixed wing flying for many of the pilots and observers. No Telegraphists Air were carried because of the short drafting notice. This also necessitated Centaur landing her 849 AEW Flight to provide room as a large Commonwealth exercise in waters off Ceylon was scheduled based around carrier based AS operations.

The squadron remained with HMS Centaur throughout the remainder of that Commission, visiting the Persian Gulf - the first Aircraft Carrier to test conditions in the height of summer with cockpit and flight deck temperatures often approaching 160F, before sailing for the Far East including Japan and later Australia.

The ship returned to Home Waters in April 1960 and the Squadron was disbanded on board in the North Sea three months later, returning its aircraft to RNAS Abbotsinch - from whence they had hastily been retrieved from the mud 15 months previously. It was the last fixed wing AS Squadron embarked in the Royal Navy, although several aircraft went on to serve with 831 Squadron embarked and ashore and with COD flights. XG 797 is preserved at the Imperial War Museum at RAF Duxford.

It commissioned again on 3 March 1983 at RNAS Culdrose, flying ten Sea King HAS.5, with which they took on part of the role of 737 Naval Air Squadron. They had some responsibility for advanced flying training tasks, but some of these were transferred to 706 Naval Air Squadron in October 1985. The squadron was re-equipped with the Sea King HAS.6 in October 1989, with the last HAS.5s being retired in February 1990. 810 absorbed 
E Flt of 826 Naval Air Squadron in July 1993, when 826 Squadron was disbanded.  810 Squadron was decommissioned in July 2001, with its main role passing to 814 Naval Air Squadron, and its Search and Rescue element passing to 771 Naval Air Squadron.

Aircraft operated
The squadron operated a variety of different aircraft and versions:
 Blackburn Dart
 Blackburn Ripon IIc
 Blackburn Baffin
 Blackburn Shark II
 Fairey Swordfish I & II
 Fairey Albacore I
 Fairey Barracuda II & Tr.II
 Fairey Firefly FR.4, AS.5 & FR.5
 Supermarine Sea Otter I
 Hawker Sea Fury FB.11
 Hawker Sea Hawk FGA.4 & FGA.6
 Fairey Gannet AS.4
 Westland Sea King HAS.5 & HAS.6

References

Citations

Bibliography

External links
 810 Squadron pre war
 810 Squadron wartime
 810 Squadron post war

Military units and formations established in 1933
800 series Fleet Air Arm squadrons
Military units and formations of the United Kingdom in the Korean War